"Pride of Africa" is a 1995 song by Swedish duo Yaki-Da, released via Metronome label as the third single from their debut album, Pride (1995). It is written by Jonas Berggren from Ace of Base. The Europop song with elements from Eurodance and reggae fusion music peaked at number 19 on the RPM Dance/Urban chart in Canada. Its accompanying music video, directed by Nigel Burgess Jones, features the duo on a train through Africa and also performing the song with local people watching them.

Track listing
"Pride of Africa" (Radio) – 3:34
"Pride of Africa" (Radiant Remix) – 4:33
"Pride of Africa" (Rapino Brothers Latin Version) – 7:20
"Pride of Africa" (Rapino Brothers Mental Mix) – 5:51

Charts

Credits
Written by Jonas "Joker" Berggren
Vocals – Linda Schonberg & Marie Knutsen 
Choir by L. Schonberg, M. Knutsen, B. Stenström, J. Ballard, J. Berggren

References

1995 singles
1995 songs
English-language Swedish songs
Mega Records singles
Music videos directed by Nick Burgess-Jones
Reggae fusion songs
Songs about Africa
Songs written by Jonas Berggren
Yaki-Da songs